Chico Potts (born February 28, 1976) is a former college basketball head coach for Mississippi Valley State University. He is now the head coach for Gentry High School.

Head coaching record

References

1976 births
Living people
American men's basketball coaches
College men's basketball head coaches in the United States
Delta State Statesmen basketball coaches
Delta State Statesmen basketball players
High school basketball coaches in the United States
LSU Tigers basketball players
Mississippi Valley State Delta Devils basketball coaches
American men's basketball players
Guards (basketball)